John Dempsey is an American theatrical lyricist and playwright who has worked in Britain and the United States.  His work has been produced in Japan, Brazil and other countries.  Much of his work in musical theater has been written with composer Dana P. Rowe.   With Rowe, he wrote the book and lyrics for Zombie Prom (1995), The Fix (directed by Sam Mendes, 1997), and the stage adaptation of John Updike's The Witches of Eastwick (2000).  Rowe and Dempsey were nominated for the Olivier Award for The Fix and The Witches of Eastwick, both of which were produced in London by Cameron Mackintosh.  He was the co-lyricist for The Pirate Queen, collaborating with composer Claude-Michel Schönberg and lyricist Alain Boublil.

With playwright/lyricist Rinne Groff and composer Michael Friedman, Dempsey co-wrote the book and lyrics for the musical adaptation of the movie Saved!, which was produced by Playwrights Horizons in New York City in 2008.

An original musical by Dempsey and Rowe, Brother Russia, in which a "fourth-rate Russian theatre troupe... in a desolate potato field north of Omsk" proves to be led by the seemingly immortal Rasputin, premiered between March 6 and April 15, 2012, by the Signature Theatre in Arlington, Virginia.

References

External links
 
 
 
 

American musical theatre lyricists
Living people
Year of birth missing (living people)